William Pitt Ballinger (September 25, 1825 – January 20, 1888) was a Texas lawyer and statesman. He had a significant impact on the development of Texas realty and railroad law. He originally supported the Confederacy during the Civil War. He was instrumental, following the war, in the reconstruction in Texas, the emancipation of black slaves, and the industrial development of the South.

The town of Ballinger, Texas was officially named in his honor.

Early life
In the summer of 1843, at the age of 18, he moved from his hometown of Barbourville, Kentucky, to Galveston, Texas, to read law and finish his legal training under his uncle, James Love. His uncle's strenuous reading plan and insistence on attending courtroom proceedings helped Ballinger develop a lifelong love of books and renewed confidence in his self-education.

See also
José María Jesús Carbajal

References

 Moretta, John Anthony. William Pitt Ballinger. Texas State Historical Association, 2000.

External links

Texas lawyers
People from Galveston, Texas
1825 births
1888 deaths
People from Barbourville, Kentucky
American lawyers admitted to the practice of law by reading law
19th-century American lawyers